Joseph Albree Gilmore (June 10, 1811 – April 17, 1867) was an American railroad superintendent from Concord, New Hampshire and the 29th governor of New Hampshire from 1863 to 1865.

Biography
Joseph A. Gilmore was born in Weston, Vermont on June 10, 1811. He was educated in Vermont, and moved to Boston to learn the mercantile business.  Gilmore then moved to Concord, New Hampshire, where he established a wholesale grocery business.

Gilmore became involved with the Concord and Claremont Railroad, serving first as a construction agent, and later as the railroad's general superintendent.  He also served as superintendent of the Manchester and Lawrence Railroad and the Portsmouth and Concord Railroad.

Originally a Whig, Gilmore joined the Republican when it was founded in the mid-1850s.  He served in the New Hampshire State Senate from 1858 to 1860, and was the Senate's President pro Tempore in 1859.

Gilmore was elected Governor in 1863 and reelected in 1864, and served from June 3, 1863 to June 8, 1865.  Serving during the American Civil War. Gilmore's term was consumed by support for the Union, including a loan to provide bonuses and supplemental salary payments to soldiers, and arranging for the transport of soldiers traveling to New Hampshire on furlough and returning to the front lines.

Death and burial
Gilmore died in Concord, New Hampshire on April 17, 1867, and is buried at the Mount Auburn Cemetery in Cambridge, Massachusetts.

Family
Gilmore was married to Ann Page Whipple, and they had eleven children.

Their daughter Ann was the first wife of Senator William E. Chandler.

Their son Joseph Henry Gilmore was a Newton Theological Seminary trained Baptist pastor, and wrote the words to the hymn "He Leadeth Me", inspired by the 23rd Psalm.

Notes

External links
Gilmore at New Hampshire's Division of Historic Resources

Joseph Albree Gilmore at National Governors Association
Joseph A. Gilmore at Herringshaw's National Library of American Biography, Volume II (1909)
Joseph Albree Gilmore at American Civil War: The Definitive Encyclopedia and Document Collection (2013)

1811 births
1867 deaths
New Hampshire Whigs
19th-century American politicians
New Hampshire Republicans
New Hampshire state senators
Governors of New Hampshire
People of New Hampshire in the American Civil War
People from Weston, Vermont
Burials at Mount Auburn Cemetery
Union (American Civil War) state governors
Republican Party governors of New Hampshire